Saishunkan was a han medical school, established by Hosokawa Shigekata in 1756 in Kumamoto, Japan. Internal medicine (Chinese medicine), surgery (treatment of wounds), ophthalmology, pediatrics, gynecology, oral medicine, acupuncture, acupressure were taught.

History
Murai Kenboku, who already had a private school and a reputation and treated Hosokawa Shigekata was ordered to build a school in 1756 at Kumamoto and the school was started in January 1757 at Nihongi. A botanical garden was started in 1756. The school was moved to Yamasaki (now Kon-ya imamachi) in 1771 and was discontinued in 1870 at Meiji restoration. Furushiro Medical School was started in Kumamoto Castle in the same year. These were the forerunners of the Faculty of Medicine, Kumamoto University.

Principles of Saishunkan

Wall Motto by Nagaoka Naizen
Medicine was started by Ki-oh(岐黄) who wrote a medical book and medicine is based on virtue or saving life, the central dogma of Japanese medicine. You must not select your patients by his rank, you must disregard the highness of fees. You must do your duties. Treatment should be based on science. Otherwise, do not rely on your transient luck. Respect your teachers.

Saishunkan Kaiyaku by Murai Kenboku
You must know. The government begins a medical school and stores a number of books, hires professors and teaches students various lessons; in order to minimize death in early years and death by infectious diseases. This is great grace. You must get up early, study till midnight, study hard and broadly, you accomplish your duties, you must broaden your virtue.  Do your best. Do not be lazy.

Students
The first students numbered 239. They numbered 269 if official doctors and aged doctors were included.

Administration
Under the school bugyo, there were people,a school surveillance man, a doctor surveillance man, professors, surgeons and others.
Bugyo (奉行), often translated as "commissioner" or "magistrate" or "governor," was a title assigned to government officers in pre-modern Japan; other terms would be added to the title to describe more specifically a given commissioner's tasks or jurisdiction.

Subjects and textbooks
Internal medicine (Chinese medicine), surgery, ophthalmology, pediatrics, gynecology, oral medicine, acupuncture, acupressure were taught. In addition, anatomy and pharmacology were taught.
Textbooks named 内経 was medicine in general.脈経 was diagonostics.病源候論 was symptomotology, 傷寒論 was a textbook of internal medicine. 甲乙経 meant acupuncture and acupressure. 本草綱目 was Chinese medicine vegetables and their use. Medicine changes according to age, and the notebooks of lectures were also made textbooks.

Examinations
Examinations were performed, including surgery. Grading of doctors was made such as great doctor, good doctor, etc. In later years, western medicine was taught, and translation of Japanese to western language was tested.

Other medical schools
There were other private medical schools in Kumamoto.

See also
History of Kumamoto Prefecture

References
Higo Iiku Shi or history of medical education in Kumamoto, by Masatada Yamasaki. 1929 Chinzei Ikai Jihousha, Kumamoto .It has 746 pages plus 132 pages of supplement. It was reprinted in 2006 in its original form.
100 years of the department of ophthalmology of Kumamoto University Tanihara H, Okamura R. Department of ophthalmology, Kumamoto University, 2005. Maps and photographs of institutions were shown.
Anecdotes of Hosokawa Shigekata Kawaguchi K. Kumamoto Nichi-Nichi Shimbun, 2008.

Educational institutions established in 1756
1756 establishments in Japan
Educational institutions disestablished in 1870
Medical schools in Japan
Kumamoto
History of Kumamoto Prefecture